Palma Campania, known until 1863 as Palma di Nola, is a comune (municipality) in the  Metropolitan City of Naples in the Italian region Campania, located about 25 km east of Naples.

Palma Campania borders the following municipalities: Carbonara di Nola, Domicella, Lauro, Liveri, Nola, Poggiomarino, San Gennaro Vesuviano, San Giuseppe Vesuviano, Sarno, Striano, Ottaviano.

The city is famous also for the "Carnevale Palmese".

History
Archaeological evidence indicates human habitation of the area in the early Bronze Age (c. 1850 BCE), but the foundation of the town is  more recent. It has been suggested that Palma was founded in the sixth century CE by people taking refuge from the eruptions of Mount Vesuvius; alternatively it may be linked to a Roman consul named Palma who held office at the beginning of the first century CE. 

Ramains of the ancient Roman Aqua Augusta aqueduct feeding the bay of Naples are nearby at Ponte Tirone.

The oldest building still standing is the ninth-century church of San Martino, in the frazione Vico. The earliest extant documentary record of the place dates to 997. During the Middle Ages the town's fortunes were linked to the noble families Di Palma, Orsini, Della Tolfa, Pignatelli, Di Bologna, Caracciolo, Salluzzo, and Compagna.

References

Cities and towns in Campania